Events from the 12th century in Denmark.

Monarchs 

 Eric I, 1095–1103
 Niels, 1104–1134
 Eric II, 1134–1137
 Eric III, 1137–1146
 Sweyn III and Canute V, 1146–1157
 Valdemar I, 1154–1182
 Canute VI, 1170–1202

Events 

 7 January 1131 – Canute Lavard is assassinated after being lured into a forest by Magnus the Strong. Soon after, Eric II amasses forces to avenge his half-brother's death, resulting in the Battle of Jellinge Heath and the outbreak of the Danish Civil Wars.
 1131–1132 – Supporters of Magnus the Strong lay Siege to Schleswig.
 1132 – Eric II's forces defeat supporters of Magnus the Strong in the naval Battle of Sejerø.
 1133 – Magnus' supporters defeat the forces of Eric II and conquer Zealand at the Battle of Værebro.
 4 June 1134 – Eric II's forces are victorious against supporters of Magnus at the Battle of Fotevik.
 1134 – Pomeranian forces invade and loot Roskilde and Copenhagen.
 23 October 1157 – the Danish Civil War ends following the Battle of Grathe Heath. Valdemar I becomes undisputed king of Denmark.
 1147 – Danish forces attack Dobin am See as part of the Wendish Crusade.
 1168 – Valdemar I and his army attack Rügen. Overthrowing the Rani's autonomy, destroying a Svetovid temple, and installing Christian princes.

Births 

 1127 – Esbern Snare (died 1204)
 14 January 1131 – Valdemar I of Denmark (died 1182)
 1158 – Valdemar Knudsen (died 1236 in Cîteaux)
 28 June 1170 – Valdemar II of Denmark (died 1241)
 1174 – Ingeborg of Denmark, Queen of France (died 1237 in France)

Date unknown

 c. 1100 – Saint Kjeld (died c. 1150)
 c. 1106 – Magnus the Strong (died 1134 in Scania)
 c. 1118 – Christina of Denmark, Queen of Norway (died 1139)
 c. 1120 – Eric III of Denmark (died 1146)
 c. 1125 – Sweyn III of Denmark (died 1157)
 c. 1128 – Absalon (died 1201)
 c. 1129 – Canute V of Denmark (died 1157)
 c. 1135 – Helen of Sweden
 c. 1145 – Christina Hvide (died c. 1200)
 c. 1150 – Saxo Grammaticus (died c. 1220)
 c. 1165 – Benedicta Hvide (died c. 1199 in Sweden)
 c. 1167 – Anders Sunesen (died 1228)
 c. 1180 – Helena of Denmark (died 1233 in Lüneburg)
 c. 1190 – Richeza of Denmark, Queen of Sweden (died 1220)

Deaths 

 10 July 1103 – Eric I of Denmark (born c. 1060, died in Cyprus)
 1103 – Boedil Thurgotsdatter, Queen consort (died in Jerusalem)
 1104 – Svend Tronkræver
 7 January 1131 – Canute Lavard (born 1096)
 4 June 1134 – Henrik Skadelår (born c. 1090)
 25 June 1134 – Niels, King of Denmark (born c. 1063)
 1134 – Bjørn Haraldsen Ironside
 1135 – Harald Kesja (born c. 1080)
 18 September 1137 – Eric II of Denmark (born c. 1090)
 27 August 1146 – Eric III of Denmark (born c. 1120)
 16 January 1151 – Hermann of Schleswig
 1151 – Asser Rig (born c. 1078)
 9 August 1157 – Canute V of Denmark (born c. 1129)
 23 October 1157 – Sweyn III of Denmark (born c. 1125)
 1176 – Margrethe of Roskilde
 1180 – Niels of Aarhus
 12 May 1182 – Valdemar I of Denmark (born 1131)
 1 June 1197 – Gertrude of Bavaria
 5 May 1198 – Sophia of Minsk, Queen consort

Date unknown

 c. 1100 – Svend Høra
 c. 1113 – Skjalm Hvide
 c. 1131 – Cecilia Knutsdatter (born c. 1083)
 c. 1150 – Saint Kjeld (born c. 1100)
 c. 1157 – Inger Eriksdotter
 c. 1170 – Wetheman

References 

 
Centuries in Denmark